Water pollution in Canterbury, New Zealand has become a major environmental issue, largely due to pollution from agricultural sources, but also industrial and urban sources.

Water resources are under the jurisdiction of the Canterbury Regional Council (Environment Canterbury) under the Resource Management Act (RMA); water abstraction and use for irrigation purposes requires a resource consent.

The municipal water supply for Christchurch is sourced from the aquifers beneath the city.

Background
Due to the rain shadow effect of the Southern Alps the rainfall in Canterbury is lower than many other parts of the country at 500–700 mm per year. Water from melting snow and ice and from rainfall drain into the predominantly braided rivers on the Canterbury Plains. The rivers recharge the aquifers beneath the plains.

The Canterbury Region was traditionally arable and livestock farming but there have been a large number of dairy conversions in the region. In recent years there has been a huge expansion in dairy farming throughout the South Island. Dairy farming requires the intensive use of water and it is placing a high demand on water resources in the Canterbury Region.

Issues

The rivers and groundwater are being polluted with nitrates and E. coli. Nitrate concentrations in the groundwater are above the drinking water standards in around 7% of monitored wells according to 2017 data from Environment Canterbury. According to Environment Canterbury's 2 017 progress report on the Canterbury Water Management Strategy, 71% of the 224 wells sampled in 2015 showed no increasing or decreasing nitrate trend, 25% of wells showed an increase nitrate trend and 4% showed a decreasing nitrate trend.

According to the Ministry for the Environment, 77% of Canterbury rivers and lakes are graded excellent or good for swimming and 4% are graded as poor.

Inorganic nutrients, an indication of water quality, are considered to be low but increase closer to the coast. For 2000-2001 28% of tested sites were classed as "alert" due to the presence of organic pollutants.

Water pollution of the two rivers flowing through the city of Christchurch, the Avon and the Heathcote, is of concern. Untreated sewage can flow into the rivers during times of high rainfall. The estuary where the two rivers discharge had received treated water from the sewerage treatment plant that processed the city's sewage. However, a pipeline was constructed to discharge the water into Pegasus Bay. It became operational in 2010.

The Central Plains Water scheme is a large-scale proposal for water diversion, damming, reticulation and irrigation over an area of 60,000 ha.

A large number of resource consent applications for intensive dairy farming in the Mackenzie Basin attracted opposition due in part to the potential effects on water quality. The resource consents were called in under the RMA by the Minister for the Environment Nick Smith.

Cheviot has been on a boil water notice since October 2004.

Mitigation
The Dairying and Clean Streams Accord was set up by Fonterra and a number of government agencies as a means of reducing nonpoint source pollution. The Accord is criticised for not achieving its goals.

In recent years, Environment Canterbury has introduced stricter environmental requirements for farms with most farms now required to have Farm Environment Plans as well as many farms having nutrient discharge limits on nitrogen losses. Farm Environment Plans require farms to plan and demonstrate they are actively managing environmental practices such as nutrient application, erosion risk, irrigation, dairy effluent and waterway protection (through fencing off waterways in intensively stocked areas and riparian planting).

Recent assessments of water quality in Canterbury have indicated that the introduction of these new requirements is helping to improve water quality. Nitrogen, phosphorus, sediment and e.coli are all now improving at more monitored sites than are worsening. Turbidity is the only measure which showed more sites worsening.

Prosecutions
In recent years prosecutions have been made for causing water pollution:

2009 – Philip Curry was fined $5,000 after pleading guilty to discharging effluent onto land that may have resulted in contaminants entering nearby Barry's Bay Stream.
2009 – Corlette Holdings was fined $10,000 after pleading guilty to two charges of discharging effluent from an irrigator resulted in ponding and a second charge of effluent being discharged, which may have resulted in contaminated water.
2010 – A prosecution against Brook Farms and Mosbro Farms in Ashburton was withdrawn after they agreed to mitigate the effects of the effluent discharge.
 In 2012, Springston dairy farm company, White Gold Ltd, was fined a record $90,000 after illegally discharging 45,000 litres of diluted dairy effluent over a three-day period in 2010. The public reported the dairy effluent flowing into waterways that flowed into Lake Ellesmere.

See also
Canterbury Water Management Strategy
Water pollution in New Zealand
Water in New Zealand
Environment of New Zealand
Agriculture in New Zealand

References

Further reading

External links
Water quality and quantity page at the Environment Canterbury
Canterbury Water Management Strategy
Waterways, wetlands and drainage guide at the Christchurch City Council
Water Rights Trust
Our Water Our Vote lobby group

Environment of Canterbury, New Zealand
Canterbury